The 1879 college football season had no clear-cut champion, with the Official NCAA Division I Football Records Book listing Princeton and Yale having been selected as national champions.

Racine College and the University of Michigan played the first football game in the Midwest. The 1879 Michigan Wolverines football team beat Racine in a game played in Chicago.  

The US Naval Academy also had its first game; the team did not have a coach until 1890.

Conference and program changes

Conference standings

References